The West Branch of the Little Dead Diamond River is a  river in northern New Hampshire in the United States. It is a tributary of the Little Dead Diamond River, located in the Androscoggin River watershed of Maine and New Hampshire.

The river rises in the town of Clarksville on the eastern slopes of Crystal Mountain, a  ridge. The river, never larger than a brook, flows northeast into the Atkinson and Gilmanton Academy Grant, where it joins the Little Dead Diamond River.

See also

List of rivers of New Hampshire

References

Rivers of New Hampshire
Rivers of Coös County, New Hampshire